is a railway station on the Hisatsu Line in Yūsui, Aira District, Kagoshima, Japan, operated by Kyushu Railway Company (JR Kyushu).
The station opened in 1903.

Lines
Kurino Station is served by the Hisatsu Line.

Adjacent stations

Surrounding area
Kirishima Open Air Museum

Yūsui Town Hall
Yūsui Town Kurino Junior High School
Yūsui Town Kurino Junior Elementary School
Kurino Kindergarten
Kurino Post Office
Kyūshū Expressway: Kurino Interchange

See also
 List of railway stations in Japan

External links

  

Railway stations in Japan opened in 1903
Railway stations in Kagoshima Prefecture
Yūsui, Kagoshima